Dorothy Edna Roche  (born 1928), is a former international lawn bowls competitor for Australia.

Bowls career
She won the triples gold medal and fours silver medal at the 1985 World Outdoor Bowls Championship in Melbourne, Australia. Three years later she won double gold after winning both the triples and fours at the 1988 World Outdoor Bowls Championship in Auckland.

Roche became Australia's oldest Commonwealth Games gold medal winner when she won the women's fours at the 1990 Commonwealth Games, in Auckland, at the age of 61 years and 10 months.

She won three medals at the Asia Pacific Bowls Championships including a gold medal in the 1993 triples, in Victoria, Canada.

Roche was awarded the Order of Australia for services to bowls in 1990.

References

1928 births
Australian female bowls players
Bowls World Champions
Living people
Commonwealth Games gold medallists for Australia
Bowls players at the 1990 Commonwealth Games
Commonwealth Games medallists in lawn bowls
Recipients of the Medal of the Order of Australia
20th-century Australian women
Medallists at the 1990 Commonwealth Games